Erlach may refer to:

Places

Austria
Erlach (Kallham), a locality of Kallham
Erlach (Pischelsdorf), a locality of Pischelsdorf am Engelbach 
Bad Erlach, also known as Erlach an der Pitten in Wiener Neustadt-Land, Lower Austria

Germany
Erlach, a borough of Renchen, Baden-Württemberg
Erlach am Inn, a borough of Simbach am Inn, Bavaria
Erlach am Main, a borough of Neustadt am Main, Bavaria
Erlach (Hirschaid), a small village in Bavaria

Switzerland
Erlach, Switzerland, in the canton of Bern
Erlach Castle, a castle in the municipality of Erlach
Erlach (district), a district in the canton of Bern
Erlach Abbey, a Benedictine monastery in Gals, Canton of Bern

People with the surname
von Erlach family, a noble Bernese patrician family
Burkhard von Erlach (1566–1640), German lawyer and Hofmarschall of Christian II, Prince of Anhalt-Bernburg
Franz Ludwig von Erlach (1575–1651), of the von Erlach family
Hieronymus von Erlach (1667-1748), of the von Erlach family
Johann Bernhard Fischer von Erlach (1656–1723), Austrian architect, sculptor, and architectural historian
Joseph Emanuel Fischer von Erlach (1693–1742), Austrian architect of the Baroque, Rococo and Baroque classicism
Monika Erlach, Austrian pole vault champion
Romi Erlach, Estonian host of the 1999 and 2003 Eurovision Song Contest pre-selections
Rudolf von Erlach (1299–1360), Swiss knight and military commander
Rudolf von Erlach (1448-1507), built a castle in Bümpliz-Oberbottigen, Bern, Switzerland
Sigmund von Erlach (1614–1699), Swiss military commander and politician of Bern